The Tyukyan (Tüükeen) is a river in the Republic of Sakha in Russia.

There are no permanent settlements by the river, but its source lies close to Eyik village in Olenyoksky District.

History

In 1634, Russian Cossacks, headed by Voin Shakhov, established a winter settlement at the confluence of the rivers Vilyuy and Tyukyan. This settlement served as the seat of administration of the surrounding area for several decades, after which it was moved to the Yolyonnyokh area  down by the Vilyuy River.

Course 

It flows roughly southeastwards and eastwards. When it reaches the Central Yakutian Lowland it begins to meander strongly among swamps and small lakes, flowing roughly southwards, until it meets the left bank of the Vilyuy near Verkhnevilyuysk.

There are numerous thermokarst lakes in the lower Tyukyan river basin. The main tributaries of the Tyukyan are the Tenkelyakh and the Chilli (Чилли). The Tyukyan freezes between mid October and late May.

See also
List of rivers of Russia

References

External links
 
 Geography - Yakutia Organized

Rivers of the Sakha Republic
Central Yakutian Lowland